Brett Anthony Liddle (born 11 March 1970) is a professional golfer from South Africa.

Liddle was born in Boksburg. He turned professional in 1992 and picked up his first win on the Sunshine Tour a year later. He would add five more wins between then and 2000. His best year on tour was in 1995, winning twice.

Professional wins (9)

Sunshine Tour (6)
1993 Iscor Newcastle Classic
1995 Rustenburg Classic, Trustbank Gauteng Classic
1996 Kalahari Classic
1999 Lombard Tyres Classic
2000 Lombard Tryes Classic

IGT Pro Tour wins (2)

Other wins (1)
1995 Radio Algoa Challenge

References

External links

South African male golfers
Sunshine Tour golfers
People from Boksburg
Sportspeople from Gauteng
White South African people
1970 births
Living people
20th-century South African people